The Flushing Remonstrance was a 1657 petition to Director-General of New Netherland Peter Stuyvesant, in which some thirty residents of the small settlement at Flushing requested an exemption to his ban on Quaker worship. It is considered a precursor to the United States Constitution's provision on freedom of religion in the Bill of Rights.

Background
The village, originally named as Vlissingen, then Vlishing, and now Flushing, Queens, New York, had been part of the Dutch colony of New Netherland. It was originally settled by English people operating under a patent, issued by Governor Willem Kieft in 1645, granting them the same state of religious freedom existing in Holland, then the most tolerant of European countries.

Stuyvesant, however, with his 1656 ordinance against illegal religious meetings, had formally banned the practice of all religions outside of the Dutch Reformed Church, the established church of the Netherlands, in the colony. His often-derided decision flew against the approximately hundred-year development of religious tolerance in the Netherlands. During this time the country was revolting against Spanish rule, rebelling against an imposed Inquisition, attempting to form a national identity, and trying to unify Calvinist and Catholic provinces. The Dutch toleration debates were lengthy, bumpy, heated, and full of political intrigue and even assassination. The writer Thomas Broderick states, "I believe the true Dutch legacy is not one of toleration but of discussion. New Amsterdam and the Republic show us that a robust, open public discourse is the surest way to eventual social improvement. Toleration and acceptance are political and moral imperatives, and the Flushing remonstrance and great Dutch toleration debates in Europe and North America teach us that social change takes time, open dialogue, disagreement, and failure before progress is to be made."

Stuyvesant's policy was not very different from the one evolving in the Netherlands: an official recognition of the Dutch Reformed Church bundled with broad tolerance within the church and a policy of connivance, turning a blind eye to non-conformist religious practices. At the same time, Stuyvesant also opposed Jewish arrival in New Amsterdam. On another front, the Stuyvesant family was broadly tolerant.  Judith, Stuyvesant's wife, was a fierce advocate for New York's slaves, promoting the practice of baptism as a first step toward freedom.

His policy met with resistance from some English settlers in the towns of Vlissingen (currently Flushing), Rustdorp (currently Jamaica, Queens), and 's Gravesande (currently Gravesend, Brooklyn), places where Quaker missions were sent.  Stuyvesant's actions, however, also met with the support of other English settlers and magistrates who informed on those embracing unorthodox teachings and meeting in small and unsanctioned religious meetings of lay people called conventicles.  Thus, Stuyvesant found himself drawn into the religious debates and bickering of the English community in the Atlantic colonies and debates in England which culminated in the Conventicle Act 1664.

This policy resulted in numerous acts of religious persecution and harassment.  In 1656 William Wickenden, a Baptist minister from Rhode Island, was arrested by Dutch colonial authorities, jailed, fined, and exiled for baptizing Christians in Flushing. In the same year Robert Hodgson was arrested, tried, and sentenced to two years of manual labor with slaves for his preaching of Quakerism. In 1661, in the town of Rustdorp, Henry Townsend (Norwich) and Samuel Spicer were fined for holding Quaker conventicles and Townsend was banished as well.  Stuyvesant sent three new magistrates, all Englishmen, and a half dozen soldiers to gather information on dissidents.  The soldiers were billeted in the homes of the dissidents until they agreed to conform.  In 1662, in 's-Gravesande, Samuel Spicer and his mother, Micha, along with John and Mary Tilton were imprisoned and later banished.  They moved to Oyster Bay, then outside of the authority of New Netherland, and returned to their town after 1664 when the British took control of the colony.

Events
The Flushing Remonstrance was signed on December 27, 1657, by a group of Dutch citizens who were affronted by persecution of Quakers and the religious policies of Stuyvesant. None of them were Quakers. The Remonstrance ends with:

The law of love, peace and liberty in the states extending to Jews, Turks and Egyptians, as they are considered sonnes of Adam, which is the glory of the outward state of Holland, soe love, peace and liberty, extending to all in Christ Jesus, condemns hatred, war and bondage. And because our Saviour sayeth it is impossible but that offences will come, but woe unto him by whom they cometh, our desire is not to offend one of his little ones, in whatsoever form, name or title hee appears in, whether Presbyterian, Independent, Baptist or Quaker, but shall be glad to see anything of God in any of them, desiring to doe unto all men as we desire all men should doe unto us, which is the true law both of Church and State; for our Saviour sayeth this is the law and the prophets.

Therefore if any of these said persons come in love unto us, we cannot in conscience lay violent hands upon them, but give them free egresse and regresse unto our Town, and houses, as God shall persuade our consciences, for we are bounde by the law of God and man to doe good unto all men and evil to noe man. And this is according to the patent and charter of our Towne, given unto us in the name of the States General, which we are not willing to infringe, and violate, but shall houlde to our patent and shall remaine, your humble subjects, the inhabitants of Vlishing.

In response Stuyvesant dismissed the local government and chose new Dutch replacements as leaders.  Four who signed were arrested by order of Stuyvesant. Two immediately recanted, but the writer of the remonstrance, Edward Hart, and sheriff of Flushing Tobias Feake remained firm in their convictions. Both men were remanded to prison where they survived in isolation on rations of bread and water for over a month. After friends and family petitioned Stuyvesant on behalf of the elderly Hart, the clerk was released on penalty of banishment. Feake held out for a few more weeks, but eventually recanted and was pardoned after being fined and banned from holding public office.

Stuyvesant asserted that he was not violating the signers' "freedom of conscience," only their right to worship outside of family prayer meetings. In addition he proclaimed March 13, 1658 a Day of Prayer for the purpose of repenting from the sin of religious tolerance.

Subsequently, John Bowne of the colony allowed Quakers to meet in his house. He was arrested in 1662 and brought before Stuyvesant. Unrepentant, Bowne was sentenced to banishment to Holland, though he was of English descent and spoke no Dutch. After several months in the foreign land, Bowne petitioned the directors of the Dutch West India Company. After a month of deliberation, the Dutch West India Company agreed to support Bowne, and advised Stuyvesant by a letter (1663) that he was to end religious persecution in the colony. One year later, in 1664, the colony fell to British control. The John Bowne House, built before 1662, still stands in historic preservation.

The Quaker Meeting House in Flushing, built 1694, is now the oldest house of worship in continuous use in New York State.

Signers
The 30 signers were:

 Nicolas Blackford
 George Clere
 Elias Doughtie
 Edward Farrington, magistrate
 Tobias Feake, sheriff
 Antonie Field
 Robert Field, Sr.
 Robert Field, Jr.
 John Foard
 Edward Griffin

 Edward Hart
 Nathaniel Hefferd
 Benjamin Hubbard
 John Mastine
 Michael Milner
 William Noble, magistrate
 Nicholas Parsell
 William Pidgion
 Henry Semtell
 Richard Stockton

 John Store
 Edward Tarne
 William Thorne Sr.
 William Thorne, Jr.
 John Townsend
 Henry Townsend
 Nathaniel Tue
 Micah Tue
 Phillip Udall
 George Wright

Hart signed first as clerk of the group; each of several other signers wrote an X that is labeled as their mark.

Account of John Bowne
John Bowne's account of the Flushing Remonstrance and its aftermath is found in his journal of events.  Bowne, who had arrived in 1651, soon began to host Quaker meetings in his home, although he did not convert until 1659.  He was to become a leader of American Quakers and a correspondent of Quaker founder George Fox.

Later history
The earliest copy of the document dates also from 1657 as an official copy of the original, but the original has been lost. This early copy is in longhand, on moderately severely damaged and degraded paper, yet essentially complete. It has seldom been in public anywhere.

The Queens Borough President's Office held a celebration of the 350th anniversary of the Remonstrance in 2007. Descendants of the signers, Bowne, Stuyvesant, and the arresting officer were invited and in attendance, and the original copy of the Remonstrance was brought down from the State Archives in Albany for several weeks' public display.

Bowne Park, John Bowne High School, and an elementary school in Flushing, Queens are named in John Bowne's honor.

PS 21 in Flushing is named after Edward Hart, the writer of the Remonstrance.

See also
 Remonstrants
 Jewish arrival in New Amsterdam

References

External links
 Text of Flushing Remonstrance and information
 Flushing Remonstrance
 John Bowne house and historical material
 Designed for the Good of All – A thesis by Tabetha Garman

1657 in law
1650s works
Documents of New Netherland
New Netherland
Freedom of religion
History of Quakerism
History of the Thirteen Colonies
History of New York City
History of Queens, New York
Flushing, Queens